The Baffle Creek is a creek located in Central Queensland, Australia.

Course and features
The Baffle Creek rises near Arthurs Seat in the Eurimbula State Forest and just south of the Eurimbula National Park in the Great Dividing Range. The  creek flows initially southward, hemmed to the west by the Westwood Range and to the east by Mount Dromedary. The creek continues south crossed by the Bruce Highway just east of Miriam Vale and then turns south east forming braided channels near Sonoma and hemmed to the east by the Gwynne Range resulting in the formation of one named island, Grants Island. It then is crossed by the Bruce Highway again and turns east under Mount Maria then north and flows through the Mouth of Baffle Creek Conservation Park and finally discharges into the Coral Sea south of Rules Beach and northeast of Winfield. At its mouth the creek again forms an anabranch around Long Island. 

Etymology
The creek was named in the 1850s by the pastoralist and politician, William Henry Walsh, during an expedition led by him to track an Aboriginal raiding party into the bush. The footprints of the raiders disappeared in the dense bush along the creek banks leading the party unable to follow them further and leading Walsh to name the creek as Baffle Creek.

See also

List of rivers of Queensland

References

Rivers of Queensland
Central Queensland